The Tanzania–Uganda Natural Gas Pipeline is a proposed natural gas pipeline, carrying liquefied natural gas from Tanzania to Uganda.

Location
The pipeline would start in Dar es Salaam, Tanzania's financial capital and largest city. It would travel north to Port Tanga. From Port Tanga, the pipeline would travel westwards to the lakeside city of Mwanza.

Other credible sources have suggested that the selected route might go underwater, through Lake Victoria, which would shave several hundred kilometers off the total distance.

Overview
As far back as May 2016, the government of Tanzania expressed their intention to build a natural gas pipeline to Uganda, to evacuate liquid natural gas for sale to their northern neighbor.

Tanzania has proven natural gas reserves of 57 trillion cubic feet, with at least 49.5 trillion cubic feet of those reserves offshore in the Indian Ocean.

In August 2018, the Tanzania Petroleum Development Corporation (TPDC), began to actively search for an expert to carry out a feasibility study to determine the most economic route for this pipeline and to determine the potential and size of the regional market for Tanzania's natural gas.

The two countries agreed in 2016, to jointly develop the  East African Crude Oil Pipeline to bring land-locked Uganda's crude oil to the Tanzanian coast for export. In August 2018, the Uganda Minister of Energy, Irene Muloni, stated that the country was in direct talks with the Tanzanian government, regarding the importation of natural gas for use in Uganda's fledgling steel industry. Later that month, the two countries signed a definitive agreement to construct this gas pipeline.

See also
 Uganda–Tanzania Crude Oil Pipeline
 Tanzania Liquefied Natural Gas Project
 Mtwara–Dar es Salaam Natural Gas Pipeline

References

External links
Tanzania wants to build pipeline to pump gas to Uganda As of 6 August 2018.

Energy infrastructure in Tanzania
Energy infrastructure in Uganda
Natural gas pipelines in Uganda
Proposed energy infrastructure in Africa
Natural gas in Tanzania
Natural gas in Uganda
Natural gas pipelines in Tanzania
Tanzania–Uganda relations